Thosea cana, is a moth of the family Limacodidae first described by Francis Walker, an oriental entomologist in 1865. It is endemic to Sri Lanka, India and Taiwan.

References

Moths of Asia
Moths described in 1865
Limacodidae